The Bedlam Series is the name given to the Oklahoma–Oklahoma State rivalry. It refers to the athletics rivalry between Oklahoma State University Cowboys and Cowgirls and the University of Oklahoma Sooners of the Big 12 Conference. Both schools were also members of the Big Eight Conference before the formation of the Big 12 Conference in 1996, and both were divisional rivals in the Big 12 South Division prior to 2011. The rivalry will conclude as an annual conference matchup in 2024, when Oklahoma officially joins the Southeastern Conference. 40 years of the rivalry's games were played without the teams playing in the same conference, and it is possible that the series may continue beyond that date.

The Bedlam Series is, like most other intrastate rivalries, a rivalry that goes beyond one or two sports. Both schools also have rivalries with other schools, though most of those rivalries are limited to one or two sports at the most.

While the football and basketball games stand today as the marquee events in the Bedlam Series, the term "Bedlam" actually began with the rivalry between the schools' prestigious wrestling programs, more particularly the raucous crowds that attended the matches held at Oklahoma State's Gallagher-Iba Arena.

Football

The first Bedlam football game was held at Island Park, now known as Mineral Wells Park, in Guthrie, Oklahoma. It was a cold and extremely windy day, with temperatures well below the freezing mark. At one point during the game when the Oklahoma A&M Aggies were punting, the wind carried the ball backwards behind the kicker. If the Oklahoma A&M squad recovered the ball it would be a touchback, but if the University of Oklahoma squad recovered it, it would be a touchdown. The ball rolled down a hill into the half-frozen creek. Since a touchdown was at stake, members of both teams dove into the icy waters to recover the ball. A member of the OU team came out with the ball and downed it for a touchdown. OU won the game, 75–0. The rivalry has now been played without interruption since 1910, and alternates between the two respective campuses. Since 2011, games in odd-numbered years are contested in Stillwater, Oklahoma, on the campus of OSU, and games in even-numbered years in Norman, Oklahoma at OU. 

In 2007, author Steve Budin, whose father was a New York bookie, publicized a claim that the 1954 Bedlam Game was fixed by mobsters in his book Bets, Drugs, and Rock & Roll. Allegedly, the mobsters threatened and paid off a cook to slip laxatives into a soup consumed by many OU Sooner starting players, causing them to fall violently ill in the days leading up to the game. OU was victorious in the end, but the 14–0 win did not cover the 20-point spread in OU’s favor. However, many people involved in the 1954 contest do not recall any incident like the one purported by Budin to have occurred. Nor do any pregame and postgame newspaper articles mention any such condition. One possible reason for the Sooners' lackluster performance, according to one coach, was that the players were "beat up" from the previous game against Nebraska.

Game results

Men's basketball
Since 1916, Oklahoma has led the all-time series record in men's basketball with a record of 134-106. The Sooners have won 19 of the last 36 meetings. However, the Cowboys have gone 11-5 against the Sooners since the end of Travis Ford's tenure as head coach. The Sooners swept the Cowboys in 2018–2019, giving Oklahoma its seventh Bedlam sweep since 2006, including the 2013–2014, 2014–2015 and 2015–2016 regular season Bedlam series. Oklahoma State has swept three times in that span, during the 2016–2017, 2020-2021 and 2022-2023 regular seasons. The two teams have met seven times in the Big 12 tournament, where the Cowboys have gone 6-1 against the Sooners.

Ice Hockey 
The Bedlam Series took to the ice rink for the first time in 2022. The Oklahoma State ice hockey club had gone defunct in recent years, but was revived thanks to a grassroots effort from students. The inaugural game between the two ACHA clubs was played on November 4, 2022 at the Arctic Edge Arena in Edmond, Oklahoma, resulting in a 6-3 victory for the Sooners. The Cowboys won the following night 5-4 in OT at the BOK Center. The games were broadcast live on Black Dog Hockey, an independent streaming service that partners with many ACHA clubs. The series is tied 1-1.

Wrestling
Oklahoma State holds a lopsided advantage in the schools' wrestling rivalry, the original "Bedlam Series." The Cowboys wrestling program currently holds a 149–27–10 record against the Sooners, which is all the more remarkable considering that both schools have long been national powers in wrestling.  Oklahoma has won seven team national championships in its history, while Oklahoma State's wrestling program has a record thirty-four team national titles. Oklahoma State has earned 143 individual NCAA titles and 483 All-American honors compared to Oklahoma’s 67 individual championships and 277 All-Americans.

See also 
 List of NCAA college football rivalry games
 List of most-played college football series in NCAA Division I

References

External links
 Bedlam Series at OKState.com
 Bedlam Series at SoonerSports.com
Voices of Oklahoma interview with Bob Barry Sr. First person interview conducted on March 31, 2011, with Bob Barry Sr. Original audio and transcript archived with Voices of Oklahoma oral history project.

 

College sports rivalries in the United States
College football rivalries in the United States
Oklahoma Sooners
Oklahoma State Cowboys and Cowgirls
1900 establishments in Oklahoma Territory